Saracen  is a European medieval term for Muslims, adopted from Latin.

Saracen or Saracens may also refer to:

Art, entertainment, and media

Fictional characters
 Saracen (comics), a Marvel Comics character
 Lorraine Saracen, a character from the American television series Friday Night Lights
 Matt Saracen, a character from the American television series Friday Night Lights

Works of fiction 
The Saracen, a two-part novel by Robert Shea
The Saracen (opera), an 1899 opera by César Cui
Saracen (TV series), a 1989 ITV action drama about a private security firm of that name

Enterprises
Saracen Cycles, formerly an independent British bicycle manufacturer, now a sub brand of Madison
Saracen Foundry, Glasgow, Scotland, established in 1850

Military
Alvis Saracen, a six-wheeled armoured personnel carrier built by Alvis
HMS Saracen, six ships of the Royal Navy
Saracen, Sam Houston's horse during Battle of San Jacinto

People
Saracen (Quapaw chief), chief of the Quapaw people

Sports
Cardiff Saracens RFC, a Welsh rugby union club based in Cardiff
Cheltenham Saracens F.C., a football club based in Cheltenham, England
Newport Saracens RFC, a Welsh rugby union club based in Newport
Saracens F.C., a professional rugby union team based in London, England
 Saracens Global Network, a group of rugby union clubs affiliated with Saracens F.C., including:
 Impala Saracens, based in Nairobi, Kenya
 Lelo Saracens, based in Tbilisi, Georgia
 São Paulo Saracens Bandeirantes, based in the Brazilian city; see 2017 Americas Rugby Championship squads
 Seattle Saracens, based in the American city
 Timișoara Saracens, based in the Romanian city
 VVA Saracens, based in Monino, near Moscow, Russia
Saracens Women, a rugby union club based in London
Saracens Sports Club, a Sri Lankan cricket team
Saracens Mavericks, a netball team based in Hertfordshire, England, part owned by Saracens F.C.

Other uses
Sunbeam Saracen, an early aero engine, of which only prototypes were built

See also
Saracinesco, a commune in the Province of Rome, Italy
Sarsen, a sandstone block
Sarrazin (disambiguation)

Ethnonymic surnames